Ville de Lyon was one of three second-rank, 90-gun, steam-powered  ships of the line built for the French Navy in the 1850s. The ship participated in the Second French intervention in Mexico in the 1860s and served as a prison ship for Communard prisoners in 1871–1872 after the Paris Commune was crushed by the French government. She was scrapped in 1885.

Description
The Ville de Nantes-class ships were repeats of the preceding ship of the line  and were also designed by naval architect Henri Dupuy de Lôme. Their crew numbered 913 officers and ratings.

The Ville de Nantess were powered by a pair of four-cylinder steam engines that drove the single propeller shaft using steam provided by eight boilers.

Upon completion Ville de Lyons was armed with thirty-four 30-pounder  rifled muzzle-loading (RML) guns on the lower gundeck and thirty-four 30-pounder smoothbore cannon on the upper gundeck. On the quarterdeck and forecastle were a dozen 30-pounder cannon and a pair of 163 mm MLR guns.

Career 
Ville de Lyon conducted trials in 1861 before being put in ordinary in 1862. She took part in the Second French intervention in Mexico, and upon her return to France, became a school ship in Brest. She returned to Mexico in 1866 to ferry an infantry regiment back to France. 
 
After the Paris Commune, Ville de Lyon was used as a prison hulk in Brest. Struck in 1879, she was broken up in 1894.

Citations

References

Ships of the line of the French Navy
1861 ships
Napoléon-class ships of the line
Ville de Nantes-class ships of the line